Douglas Cameron may refer to:

 Douglas Cameron (politician) (1854–1921), Canadian politician and Lieutenant Governor of Manitoba
 Douglas Cameron (RAF officer) (born 1893), World War I flying ace
 Douglas Cameron (cricketer) (1903–1996), New Zealand cricketer
 Douglas Cameron (broadcaster) (born 1933), Scottish broadcaster
 Douglas Cameron (bishop) (born 1935), Scottish bishop
 Dougie Cameron (born 1983), Scottish football midfielder

See also
Doug Cameron (disambiguation)
Cameron Douglas (born 1978), American former actor